() is a linguistic-purity movement in Tamil literature which attempts to avoid loanwords from Sanskrit, English and other languages. The movement began in the writings of Maraimalai Adigal, Paventhar Bharathidasan, Devaneya Pavanar, and Pavalareru Perunchitthiranaar, and was propagated in the Thenmozhi literary magazine founded by Pavalareru Perunchithiranar. V. G. Suryanarayana Sastri (popularly known as Parithimar Kalaignar), a professor, was a 19th-century figure in the movement; in 1902 he demanded classical-language status for Tamil, which it received in 2004.

Movement

The modern revival of the Tamil Purist Movement (also known as the Pure Tamil Movement) is attributed to Maraimalai Adigal, who publicly pledged to defend pure Tamil in 1916. Advocates of purism popularised Tamil literature and advocated for it, organising rallies in villages and towns and making Tamil purism a political issue. The logical extension of this effort was to purge Tamil of the Sanskrit influence (including its negative social perceptions, which they believed to keep the Tamils in a state of economic, cultural, and political servitude) seen as making Tamil susceptible to northern political domination. Anti-Sanskrit and anti-Hindi Tamil Nadu policies brought them into conflicts with the Brahmins, whose dialect of Tamil incorporates more Sanskrit words than that of other groups.  

Tamil was given some national sovereignty by a language policy after Indian independence and had been used in some high schools since 1938 (and in universities from 1960). In 1956, the Indian National Congress government passed a law making Tamil the official language of Tamil Nadu, and in 1959 set up the Tamil Development and Research Council to produce Tamil textbooks in the natural and human sciences, accounting, mathematics, and other subjects. A series of children's encyclopaedias, commentaries on Sangam poetry, and a history of the Tamil people were published in 1962-63. However, these measures seemed insufficient to the proponents of "Pure Tamil", as expressed by Mohan Kumaramangalam in 1965 at the peak of the anti-Hindi agitation:

In practice, the ordinary man finds that the Tamil language is nowhere in the picture ... In Madras city like any other metro, English dominates our life to an extraordinary extent ... I think it will be no exaggeration to say that a person who earns very high can live for years in Madras without learning a word of Tamil, except for some servant inconvenience!

Since the Congress government had turned down a number of demands, such as the use of "pure" rather than "Sanskritised Tamil" in schoolbooks and resisting the name change from Madras to Tamil Nadu until 1969, it seemed unconcerned about separatism. This bred resentment among Tamil purists, as expressed by Devaneya Pavanar in 1967: 

None of the Congress Ministers of Tamil Nadu was either a Tamil scholar or a Tamil lover. The Congress leaders of Tamil Nadu as betrayers of Tamil, cannot represent the State any more. Blind cannot lead the blind, much less the keen sighted. Moreover every political meeting, they will say "Jai Hind!". This Means, they are meant to rule only in broader (not specific) India.

In the elections that year, Congress was replaced by the Dravida Munnetra Kazhagam (DMK) government under C N Annadurai.

The Tamil purism movement successfully lobbied for Tamil to be declared a "classical language" of India in 2006, a status also accorded to Sanskrit in the Indian constitution. This gave rise to the Centre for the Study of Tamil as a Classical Language in Chennai, but it took another year to obtain official Tamil translations in Tamil Nadu courts.

See also
Anti-Hindi agitations
Tamil nationalism
Devaneya Pavanar
Tamil language
Meitei classical language movement
The Primary Classical Language of the World

References
Sumathi Ramaswamy, Passions of the Tongue: Language Devotion in Tamil India, 1891-1970, Studies on the History of Society and Culture, No 29, University of California Press (1997), .
Christians and Missionaries in India: Cross-Cultural Communication Since 1500 : With Special Reference to Caste, Conversion, and Colonialism, Studies in the History of Christian Missions, Wm. B. Eerdmans Publishing Company (2003), p. 381.

External links
Movement for Linguistic Purism: The case of Tamil

Tamil-language literature
Dravidian movement
Linguistic purism
Tamil nationalism